{{Collegebowl
| name               =  Good Sam Vegas Kickoff Classic
| full_name          =
| nickname           = 
| defunct            =
| logo               = Vegas Kickoff Classic logo.png
| image_size         = 200px
| caption            = Logo for the 2021 Vegas Kickoff Classic (logo changed annually with each game)
| stadium            = Allegiant Stadium
| previous_stadiums  = 
| location           = Paradise, Nevada
| previous_locations = 
| years              = 2021–present
| previous_tie-ins   =
| conference_tie-ins = 
| payout             = 
| sponsors = 
| former_names       = 
| prev_matchup_year  = 2021
| prev_matchup_season= 2021
| prev_matchup_teams = BYU 24, Arizona 16
| next_matchup_year  = 2024
| next_matchup_season= 2024
| next_matchup_teams = USC vs LSU
}}
The Vegas Kickoff Classic' is an annual college football game played on the opening weekend of the college football season in Paradise at Allegiant Stadium, home of the Las Vegas Raiders and the UNLV Rebels. Since August 2021, the game has been sponsored by Good Sam and officially known as the Good Sam Vegas Kickoff Classic''. The Vegas Kickoff Classic is managed by the Las Vegas Bowl.

Game results

Future games

References

External links
Official website

College football kickoff games